Pertti Leo Jorma Lehtonen (born 18 October 1956 in Helsinki, Finland) is a retired professional ice hockey player who played in the SM-liiga. He played for HIFK. He was inducted into the Finnish Hockey Hall of Fame in 1998. His nickname was "Ruoska"("The whip") because of his strong slapshot.

Career statistics

Regular season and playoffs

International

External links
 Finnish Hockey Hall of Fame bio

1956 births
Living people
Finnish ice hockey players
HIFK (ice hockey) players
Ice hockey players at the 1984 Winter Olympics
Ice hockey players with retired numbers
Olympic ice hockey players of Finland
Ice hockey people from Helsinki